The following elections occurred in the year 1926.

Africa
 1926 Egyptian parliamentary election
 1926 Lagos by-election
 1926 Northern Rhodesian general election
 1926 South West African legislative election

Asia
 1926 Hong Kong sanitary board election
 1926 Madras Presidency legislative council election
 1926 Persian legislative election

Europe
 1926 Danish Folketing election
 1926 Estonian parliamentary election
 1926 Greek legislative election

United Kingdom
 1926 Darlington by-election
 1926 Smethwick by-election

North America

Canada
 1926 Canadian federal election
 1926 Alberta general election
 1926 Edmonton municipal election
 1926 Ontario general election
 1926 Toronto municipal election

Central America
 1926 Guatemalan presidential election
 1926 Honduran legislative election
 1926 Nicaraguan presidential election
 1926 Nicaraguan parliamentary election

United States
 1926 California gubernatorial election
 1926 Minnesota gubernatorial election
 1926 New York state election
 1926 South Carolina gubernatorial election
 1926 United States House of Representatives elections
 United States House of Representatives elections in California, 1926
 United States House of Representatives elections in South Carolina, 1926
 1926 United States Senate elections
 United States Senate election in South Carolina, 1926
 United States Senate special election in Massachusetts, 1926

Oceania

Australia
 1926 Eden-Monaro by-election
 1926 Queensland state election
 1926 Australian referendum

New Zealand
 1926 Eden by-election

South America
 1926 Argentine legislative election
 1926 Brazilian presidential election

See also
 :Category:1926 elections

1926
Elections